Joyce Li, also known as Li Zhen Ying  (born August 4) is a Chinese model and beauty pageant titleholder who won Miss Universe China 2016 and represented China at Miss Universe 2016 but Unplaced.

Miss Universe China 2016
Joyce Li was crowned Miss Universe China 2016 by Jessica Xue, Miss Universe China 2015. The pageant was held on December 11, 2016, and was held at the Shanghai Pudong Shangri-La Hotel Ballroom.

References

1996 births
Living people
Chinese beauty pageant winners
Miss Universe 2016 contestants
People from Shanghai
Chinese female models